University Gardens High School (Spanish: Escuela Superior University Gardens, generally abbreviated as UGHS), formally University Gardens Community School Specialized in Science and Mathematics, is a secondary magnet school located in Hato Rey Sur, San Juan, Puerto Rico. University Gardens is run by the Puerto Rico Department of Education and is overseen by its Specialized Schools Unit (UnEE, for its initials in Spanish).

University Gardens is known for its high standards, its "hard work" culture coming into the national culture. Recognized for featuring some of the highest standardized test scores in Puerto Rico, it has been criticized for having 27.8% of its student population come from living below the poverty line.

History 
Since at least 1972 a high and middle school already existed in the gated eponymous community, located in the Río Piedras district. The University Gardens neighborhood is located right along PR-52, and close to the University of Puerto Rico, Río Piedras campus. It has historically been composed mostly of middle class and upper lower class families, and serves as "serves as a buffering zone between the rich and lower class areas of San Juan". Currently, there has been an influx of upper class individuals, who have transformed some residence into mansions. In 1976, it was converted into a magnet school.

Roxánna I. Duntley-Matos described the school's appearance as it was in 1981 as:

It used to offer grades 10th-12th, however this was changed by a Department of Education reorganization.

Hurricane María, earthquakes and COVID-19 
After the 2019–20 Puerto Rico earthquakes UGHS was evaluated and, while the field inspector declared the school "suitable for immediate operation and occupancy," they did note that there were fissures on the walls, as well as the façade of a wall that was close to breakings off.

During February 2021, it was one of 172 public schools identified as "suitable to open" that formed part of an initial phase proposed by the Department to resume in-person teaching starting in March. Nevertheless, this plan was abandoned, and in-person classes did not occur until 13 May.

On the first day of class seniors came in a caravan on the first day of school, as part of their traditional celebration for the beginning of their final school year. Due to the COVID-19 pandemic, from August 2021 onwards, classes will start at 8:00 a.m. and end at 1:00 p.m., after students receive their take-out only lunch.

School community

Accreditation 

Accreditation is obtained from the Puerto Rico Education Council for six years. However, in 2014, it was approved, but not accredited, by the Council.

University Gardens is part of the Puerto Rico Department of Education's Specialized Schools Unit (UnEE, for its initials in Spanish), which at times has been under the Assistant Secretary for Academic Services, Educational Transformation Projects, Curriculum and Pedagogical Innovation Division, and the Undersecretariat for Academic and Program Affairs. In 1990, University Gardens was classified as an "Effective School", as instruction was based on Ronald Edmonds' model.

Being what is considered a five star school by the Department of Education, it receives less funds than those given to underperforming school, which receive more money for teachers' professional development. Recognized for featuring some of the highest standardized test scores in Puerto Rico, it has been criticized for having 27.8% of its student population come from living below the poverty line, as of 2018, down from 32.3% in the 1997-1998 school year, when it counted with a 758 total student population.

Superlatives 
In 2018, six students from UGHS were selected to partake in the National Grid Engineering Pipeline Program in Syracuse, sponsored by National Grid, providing them with an all-expenses paid trip to visit the Fruit Belt Neighborhood Solar Partnership, the Niagara Power Project and Syracuse University.

School grounds 
The Department of Education tends to use the school to interview applicants for posts at other schools. The school library was one of the first three public high school libraries to be chosen to participate in the Puerto Rico Librarian's Society's Puerto Rican Library Information and Documentation Network (PRILINET) in 1979.

School personnel

List of Principals

References

External links 

 Official website

1976 establishments in Puerto Rico
Education in San Juan, Puerto Rico
Educational institutions established in 1976
Hato Rey, Puerto Rico
High schools in Puerto Rico
Magnet schools
Río Piedras, Puerto Rico
Special schools in Puerto Rico
University-preparatory schools